Uya was a clan of Manchu nobility.

Notable figures

Males
Ebaigen (额栢根)
Esen (額森/额森)
Weiwu (威武/威武) - a third rank military official (護軍參領/护军参领, pinyin: hujun canling), and held the title of a first class duke (一等公)
Yuese (岳色)
Bailu (白绿), the grandfather of Imperial Noble Consort Zhuangshun
Lingshou (靈壽/灵寿; 1788–1824), served as a sixth rank literary official (筆帖式/笔帖式, pinyin: bitieshi)
Wanming (万明), served as a second rank literary official.
 Prince Consort

Females
Imperial Consort
 Empress
 Malu, Empress Xiaogongren (1660–1723), the Kangxi Emperor's consort, the mother of the Yongzheng Emperor (1678–1735), Yinzuo (1680–1685), seventh daughter (1682), Princess Wenxian (1683–1702), 12th daughter (1686–1697) and Yunti (1688–1755)

 Imperial Noble Consort
 Imperial Noble Consort Zhuangshun (1822–1866), the Daoguang Emperor's noble consort, the mother of Yixuan (1840–1891), Princess Shouzhuang (1842–1844), Yihe (1844–1868) and Yihui (1845–1877)

 Imperial Concubine
 Imperial Concubine En (1791–1847), the Jiaqing Emperor's noble lady

Princess Consort
 Primary Consort
 Yunhu's second primary consort, the mother of Hongsong (1743–1777) and Hongfeng (1744–1803)
 Yunbi's primary consort, the mother of first daughter (1734–1736), Princess (1735–1753), third daughter (1737–1745), Hongchang (1741–1795), fifth daughter (1742–1743), Princess (b. 1743) and Princess (b. 1745)

 Concubine
 Yunzhi's concubine, the mother of Lady (1703–1768) and tenth son (1716–1720)

Family tree

See also
List of Manchu clans

References
 

Manchu clans
Plain Yellow Banner